Guy Evans Cooper (January 28, 1893 – August 2, 1951), nicknamed "Rebel", was a pitcher in Major League Baseball who played from  through  for the New York Yankees (1914–15) and Boston Red Sox (1915). He was born in Rome, Georgia. 
 
In a two-season career, Cooper posted a 1–0 record with eight strikeouts and a 5.33 ERA in 11 appearances, including one start, seven games finished, and 27.0 innings pitched.

He managed the Ogden team in the Utah–Idaho League for part of the 1926 season.

Cooper died in Santa Monica, California at age 58.

External links
Baseball Reference

Boston Red Sox players
New York Yankees players
Major League Baseball pitchers
Baseball players from Georgia (U.S. state)
1893 births
1951 deaths
Sportspeople from Rome, Georgia
Minor league baseball managers
Petersburg Goobers players
Providence Grays (minor league) players
Buffalo Bisons (minor league) players
Richmond Clippers players
Portland Beavers players
Salt Lake City Bees players
Sacramento Senators players
Vernon Tigers players
Seattle Rainiers players
Yakima Indians players
Des Moines Boosters players
Lincoln Links players